The Norwegian Union of Forestry and Agricultural Workers was a trade union in Norway.

It was founded in 1912, but broke down in 1924. Well-known leading figures include Oscar Nilssen, deputy chairman from 1917 to 1921.

It was succeeded by the Norwegian Union of Forestry and Land Workers in 1927.

References

Defunct trade unions of Norway

Trade unions established in 1912
1912 establishments in Norway
Trade unions disestablished in 1924
Agriculture and forestry trade unions
Timber industry trade unions
Agricultural organisations based in Norway